Edward Barlow may refer to:

Edward Barlow (priest) (1639–1719), English priest and mechanician
Ed Barlow (born 1987), Australian rules footballer

See also
Eddie Barlow (1940–2005), South African cricketer